The Heroic Trio (Dung fong saam hap, TC: 東方三俠, pinyin: dōng fāng sān xiá) is a 1993 Hong Kong action film directed by Johnnie To, starring Michelle Yeoh, Maggie Cheung, and Anita Mui as the titular trio. Other cast include Damian Lau, Anthony Wong Chau-Sang, Paul Chun, James Pak and Yan Yee Kwan. The main characters of the film are reunited in a sequel, another 1993 film, Executioners.

Plot

An invisible woman is kidnapping newborn babies who're destined to be emperors and delivering them to the mysterious, subterranean villain known only as the "Evil Master". The police are powerless and the only hope for the city is a motley trio of women who all share a terrible past, they are: Tung (played by Anita Mui), the mild-mannered wife of a police inspector who secretly fights crime as the sword-slinging, knife-throwing heroine, "Wonder Woman"; Chat (played by Maggie Cheung) a hard-boiled, shotgun-toting bounty hunter who goes by the nickname "Thief Catcher"; and Ching (played by Michelle Yeoh), the "Invisible Woman" who is the troubled but determined right hand of the Evil Master.

Cast and roles
 Michelle Yeoh – Ching/San/Invisible Woman
 Anita Mui – Tung/Wonder Woman
 Maggie Cheung – Chat/Thief Catcher
 Damian Lau – Inspector Lau
 Anthony Wong Chau-sang – Kau
 James Pak – Professor/Inventor
 Paul Chun – Chief of Police
 Yen Shi-Kwan – Evil Master
 Chen Zhuoxin
 Jiang Haowen
 Lee Siu-kei – Leader of robbers at chemical factory
 Pamela Franklin – Chief of Police's Wife

Characters

Female Heroes

Wonder Woman
Wonder Woman is a crime fighting vigilante, trained from childhood by her strict martial arts master father. Her secret identity is Tung, wife of Police Inspector Lau, who eventually finds out who she really is. Aside from her incredible fighting prowess, Tung also utilizes a collapsible sword and numerous throwing knives shaped like butterfly wings. She is played by Anita Mui. Due to copyright reasons, her name was changed to "Shadow Fox" in the English Dub.

Invisible Woman
Ching (aka "Ching Ching") is the martial sister of Tung who ran away from their disciplinarian father when she was a child and taken in by Evil Master, becoming his main servant. She is also the childhood friend of the Thief Catcher, although they're only reunited as adults. Ching is responsible for the kidnapping of the babies using an invisible robe, which is given to her by the Professor. She is ordered to kill the Professor for the robe, but is conflicted because she has fallen in love with him, eventually deciding to fight in his memory after he dies. Ching is known to the Evil Master as "Number 3". She is the most skilled fighter of the trio, and uses a chain whip. She is portrayed by actress Michelle Yeoh in the film.

Thief Catcher
Thief Catcher is an irresponsible and greedy bounty hunter. She is initially hired by the Police Chief to rescue his own kidnapped son, stealing a baby from the hospital as bait for the kidnapper. In the ensuing struggle with Wonder Woman, the baby is accidentally killed, causing her to reevaluate her life. She grew up and underwent similar training with Ching as a child, though she escaped after three years (taking another ten in order to regain her humanity), being designated originally as "Number 7". She is referred to as "Mercy" (short for "Mercenary") in the English Dub. Often, she prefers to use her rifle and explosives in a fight, though she also has a boomerang-like sword and is an expert motorcyclist. She is played by Maggie Cheung.

Villains

The Evil Master
He is the main villain of the film. He compels Ching to steal newborn babies as part of his supernatural scheme to provide China with a new emperor. Ching has worked for him for many years. The Thief Catcher likes to refer to him as "Damned Old Monster!" as she strongly dislikes him. Played by Shi-Kwan Yen.

Production
On its release, the film was promoted as a "ground-breaking novelty for Hong Kong cinema" Producer Ching Siu-Tung used the film to try to make a name for himself outside of his work with Tsui Hark while Johnnie To developed it as pitch to become accepted as one of Hong Kong's leading action film directors.

Reception
In contemporary reviews, Tony Rayns (Sight & Sound), stated that the film was visually similar to Kirk Wong's Health Warning, but "predictably takes none of that film's risks." He noted that both Mui and Cheung approached "their iconic roles with gusto and deliver the odd camp frisson, while "Yeoh seems dispirited from start to finish." Rayns complimented parts of the film, stating that it "offers a number of simple pleasures. Its design and mise en scene are expansive and occasionally exhilarating, and it has a good sense of intersperse scenes of would-be pathos between its action set-pieces." Variety called the film a "flashy kung fu superheroine adventure full of solid production values but marred by some disturbingly gratuitous plot elements."
The review went on to note that the ambitious plot does "not always mesh with recurring comic-book tone. Full-blown climax has heroines battling their nemesis both above and below ground as the villain, as in "Terminator 2", continues to struggle even when reduced to skeletal remains."

From retrospective reviews, Donald C Willis described the film as "an amusing series of outrageous stunts" in his book Horror and Science Fiction Film IV. On Rotten Tomatoes, the film has an aggregated score of 80% based on 10 critic reviews, with an average rating of 6.8/10.

References

Further reading

External links
 
 
 
 The Heroic Trio  at Superheroes Lives

Hong Kong fantasy adventure films
1990s action films
1990s superhero films
Hong Kong superhero films
Superheroine films
1990s Cantonese-language films
Films directed by Johnnie To
Chinese New Year films
1990s Hong Kong films